Estonias are open wheel racing cars manufactured in Estonia. The first model, the Estonia 1, was built in 1958 during the Soviet period. All together there are about 1300 cars. They were branded in western Europe as TARK, Tallinna Autode Remondi Katsetehas. Later the factory was privatized and renamed "Kavor Motorsport".

Cars
Estonia 1 (1958) Used a Serpuchov 500 boxer engine with VW gearbox. At its first race, the car immediately broke a new track record. 1 made.
Estonia 2 (1959) Similar to Estonia 3 (both cars were released simultaneously), but with different suspension. 1 made.
Estonia 3 (1959) Used an Irbit 500 engine with self-engineered gearbox. 36 series cars made by 1961
Estonia 4 (1960) Built by Jaan Küünemäe, an ESO 500 speedway engine was used. 1 made.
Estonia 5 (1961) Used a Wartburg 980cc 2-stroke engine. F-junior car. 2 made.
Estonia 9 (1966) Used a Wartburg 980cc engine, 39 made
Estonia 10 (1964) A Soviet F1 car. Used a 2500cc engine. 1 made.
Estonia 11 (1964) Also a Soviet F1 car. 1 made.
Estonia 12 (1964) Used a Moskvich 408 engine. 1 made.
Estonia 13 (1964) Used a Moskvich 408 engine. 1 made.
Estonia 14 (1966) Soviet F1 car. 1 made.
Estonia 15 (1967/70) Used IZh Jupiter 350 tuned engines. This car was positioned between kart and formula racing, allowing young drivers to step into a bigger class. Top speed of 160 km/h. 83 made.
Estonia 15M (1970/74) An evolution of the Estonia 15, featuring improved aerodynamics and better cooling for the engine. 136 made.
Estonia 16 (1968) A Moskvich 412 1500 SOCH engine, magnesium wheels, and disc brakes on all wheels were used. Integrated CO2 fire extinguisher system. 6 made.
Estonia 16M (1970/75) Evolution of the Estonia 16. 100 made.
Estonia 17 (1974) Soviet F1 car. 1 made.
Estonia 18 (1972/76) Quite similar to the Estonia 16, but with Lada 1300cc engine. 76 made.
Estonia 18M (1976/77) Evolution of the Estonia 18. 37 made.
Estonia 19 (1977/79) Radiators on the sides, wings at front and rear. Lada engine. 165 made.
Estonia 20 (1980/82) New improved aerodynamics. Designed by Mart Kongo, a racing driver and engineer, and Jüri Iva. 154 made.

Estonia 21 (1981) Designed by racing engineer and driver Raul Sarap, this car was a big breakthrough. It was the first time Estonia used ground effect to help their aerodynamics. A total of 295 cars were built. The Lada 1300/1600cc engine with a TARK 5-speed gearbox was used. Rocker arm suspension was used. Practically every component was built or modified at the TARK factory.
Estonia 22 (1981) Built by Jüri Iva. The engine was from an IZh Jupiter 350 and the frame came from the Estonia 15. 1 made.
Estonia 23 (1984) Ground effect test car, pull-rod suspensions.
Estonia 24 (1985) Raul Sarap's next creation after the Estonia 21. An aluminum monocoque chassis was used and a Lada 1600 engine with fuel injection and electronic ignition was used. 4 made.
Estonia 25 (1989) Designed by Aleksander Sadovsky and Jaanus Heinsar. It was their first production car with an aluminum monocoque. Monocoques (or "bathtubs") were built in a Russian military helicopter factory, and weighted just 39 kg. The car had push-rod suspension. Most cars were sold to Poland and East Germany. Aerodynamic solutions were tested at a Russian aircraft wind tunnel. Engines were 1600cc Lada engines and 1600–1800cc VW Golf GTI units for Scandinavian F4. Some cars were equipped with western racing components. 67 made.
Estonia 26 (1994) Improved aerodynamics, VW Golf GTI engine. 6 made.
Estonia 26-9 (2000) The last Estonia car. Improved aerodynamics, Hewland gearbox, AP brakes, dry sump VW engine, improved weight distribution, improved suspension. 1 made.

There was a plan to design and build an Estonia 27 car, but it was never implemented. However, factory CEO Juhan Sein mentored the Tallinn Formula Student team for their first cars, and so heritage and knowledge were passed on to the students. The TTTK/TTÜ F-Student team has been a success, being a top 10 contender early on.
TARK Aleko JK173 (1989) This car was not produced by TARK at all. TARK facilities were planned to be used for production. The whole project was a scam and ended up as fiasco.

Technical
All of the Estonia race cars were produced under difficult situations. The Soviet planned economy made acquiring engines and other components nearly impossible. Everything had to be "wizarded out" by personal connections in the automotive industry. That being said, the Republic of Estonia was considered more open than the rest of the USSR, so it was more possible to have some information about western racing technology. For example, it was possible to smuggle in racing magazines from Finland. Also, Finnish television broadcasts could be received in northern Estonia, so TARK engineers watched F1 championships. Because of this, modern F1 solutions made their way into Tallinn.

Early Estonia cars used motorcycle engines or Wartburg 2-stroke motors. Riders (or mechanics) usually prepared the engines themselves. Later, mostly Lada 1300 or 1600 engines were used. 1300cc engines were used in "Formula Vostok" and class rules were quite strict, allowing only the stock camshaft. Later, the 1600cc class was more free, and engine power grew accordingly - up to 165 hp or even more.

From the Estonia 16 onwards, TARK built their own gearboxes. They took the ZAZ-968 gearbox casing, turned it 180° over, and used their in-house developed gear system. All the gears were quickly interchangeable for different ratios.

All major components such as the steering rack, brakes, shock absorbers, ignition systems etc. were built at the TARK factory. They also made their own magnesium wheels.

Professional drivers such as Toomas Napa or Toivo Asmer had special cars from factory, featuring wider wheels and lighter titanium and magnesium parts.

References

External links
TARK
ESTONIA autode ja Kavor Motorspordi ajalugu 

Open wheel racing cars
Motorsport in Estonia